Maria Cristina Labalan (born January 20, 1945, in Bacolod City, Negros Occidental Province), known professionally as Vangie Labalan is a Filipina actress, comedian, acting coach, and voice actress.

Life
Maria Cristina Labalan was born on January 20 in Bacolod, a highly urbanized city in the region of Western Visayas. She is a widow and has four children.

Labalan owns a company called "Synch Masters", which specialized in dubbing Mexican telenovelas and anime shows in Filipino.

Career
She began her career in radio in 1962 in Bacolod before going on to television and film, and she has been in the entertainment industry for half a century.

She was discovered by the filmmaker, stage and television director, actor, and screenwriter, Ishmael Bernal when he noticed the natural actress in her while supervising the dubbing of the film "Aliw." starred by Lorna Tolentino. Labalan rose to prominence for her breakout performance as "Aling Saling", Nora Aunor's mother in Himala (1982), in which she co-starred alongside Nora Aunor, Veronica Palileo, and Spanky Manikan, among others. Labalan also starred in several Philippine feature films including Alyas Baby Tsina (1984), Miguelito: Ang Batang Rebelde (1985), and Curacha: Ang Babaeng Walang Pahinga (1998).

Filmography

Film

Television

As a dubbing supervisor

Awards and nominations

References

Notes

Sources

External links

Living people
1945 births
People from Bacolod
Filipino television actresses
Filipino film actresses
21st-century Filipino actresses